is a Prefectural Natural Park in eastern Hokkaidō, Japan. Established in 1980, the park spans the municipalities of Kiyosato, Shari, and Shibetsu.

See also
 National Parks of Japan

References

External links 
  Map of Natural Parks of Hokkaidō
  Map of Sharidake Prefectural Natural Park

Parks and gardens in Hokkaido
Protected areas established in 1980
1980 establishments in Japan